Maurice J. Zaffke (born January 27, 1948) was an American politician and farmer.

Zaffke lived in Backus, Cass County, Minnesota with his wife and family and was a farmer. He went to University of Minnesota, College of Agriculture, and graduated from Bethel University. Zaffke served in the Minnesota House of Representatives from 1983 to 1986 and was a Republican.

References

1948 births
Living people
People from Cass County, Minnesota
Bethel University (Minnesota) alumni
University of Minnesota alumni
Farmers from Minnesota
Republican Party members of the Minnesota House of Representatives